Serafim Simeonov Todorov (born 6 July 1969) is a former Bulgarian Olympic amateur boxer. He won three consecutive gold medals at both the World and European Championships, and silver at the 1996 Olympics. He is the last boxer to defeat Floyd Mayweather Jr., albeit via a highly controversial decision, who later went on to become one of the all-time greats in professional boxing.

Amateur career
As an amateur, Todorov won the world championships three times, in 1991 at bantamweight, and in 1993 and 1995 at featherweight. He won a silver medal at bantamweight in 1989, losing to Cuban Enrique Carrion in the final. He also won the European amateur championships in 1989 and 1991 at bantamweight, and in 1993 at featherweight.

Todorov represented Bulgaria at the 1988, 1992 and 1996 Olympic Games. In 1992 he lost in the quarter-finals to North Korean Li Gwang-Sik.

At the 1996 Summer Olympics, Todorov qualified to the semi-finals where he met the then 19-year-old American, Floyd Mayweather Jr. Todorov won by a 10–9 margin, although many observers felt that Mayweather won the fight. The referee initially raised Mayweather's hand at the end of the fight. Todorov went on to the final where he lost to Somluck Kamsing from Thailand and settled for the silver medal. The majority of people believe Emil Jetchev, the Bulgarian chairman of the international referees' and judges' commission, had orchestrated Todorov's victory. Jetchev was forced to retire following the fight due to the allegations and involvement of foul play. Todorov does not deny the possibility, but says that Jetchev also orchestrated his unfair loss to Kamsing in the final.

Olympic results
1992 (at bantamweight)
Defeated John Sem (Papua New Guinea) 11–0
Defeated Joseph Chongo (Zambia) 18–6
Lost to Li Gwang-Sik (North Korea) 15–16

1996 (at featherweight)
Defeated Yevheniy Shestakov (Ukraine) 11–4
Defeated Robbie Peden (Australia) 20–8
Defeated Falk Huste (Germany) 14–6
Defeated Floyd Mayweather Jr. (United States) 10–9
Lost to Somluck Kamsing (Thailand) 5–8

Later life
Soon after his victory over Mayweather, Todorov rejected a lucrative offer from a group of American boxing promoters. He believed that if he had won the gold medal match in 1996, the Bulgarian Boxing Federation would provide more financially than the proposed contract would have. However, he received little support and decided to switch nationalities and represent Turkey at the 1997 World Amateur Boxing Championships. The Bulgarian Boxing Federation barred this move, and Todorov refused to represent his native country, ending his amateur boxing career by 2003. As of 2015, Todorov lives in Pazardzhik.

As of 2015, Serafim, a feature-length documentary film about Todorov's life has been in production. The film, directed by Robert Kolodny, is slated to be released in 2022. The nonfiction piece covers his early years, controversy at the Olympics and what his life has become since then.

References

External links

1969 births
Boxers at the 1988 Summer Olympics
Boxers at the 1992 Summer Olympics
Boxers at the 1996 Summer Olympics
Turkish male boxers
Bulgarian people of Turkish descent
Bulgarian people of Romani descent
Living people
Olympic boxers of Bulgaria
Olympic silver medalists for Bulgaria
Olympic medalists in boxing
People from Peshtera
Bulgarian male boxers
AIBA World Boxing Championships medalists
Medalists at the 1996 Summer Olympics
Bantamweight boxers